Alexander Godfried Gerardus Maria (Xander) Tielens (born 1953) is an astronomer at Leiden Observatory, Leiden University, in the Netherlands. In 2012 he received the highest distinction in Dutch science, the Spinoza Prize.

Biography
Tielens has contributed significantly to several fields of astronomy, including interstellar physics and astrochemistry. He is mostly known for his work on large aromatic molecules (PAHs) in space and on photodissociation regions.
He is also the author of a reference textbook on the interstellar medium.

Tielens is the project scientist of the HIFI instrument on board of the Herschel Space Observatory. He used to be the NASA Project Scientist of the Stratospheric Observatory for Infrared Astronomy.

Since 2012 Tielens has been a member of the Royal Netherlands Academy of Arts and Sciences.

References 

1953 births
Living people
20th-century Dutch astronomers
Leiden University alumni
Academic staff of Leiden University
Members of the Royal Netherlands Academy of Arts and Sciences
Spinoza Prize winners
Academic staff of the University of Groningen
21st-century Dutch astronomers